Warznia  is a settlement in the administrative district of Gmina Kazimierz Biskupi, within Konin County, Greater Poland Voivodeship, in west-central Poland.

The settlement has a population of 24.

References

Warznia